Lovey or Lővey may refer to:

Lovey (singer), South Korean singer-songwriter
Lovey (album), an album by the Lemonheads
Eunice "Lovey" Howell, a television character
Mária Lővey, Hungarian gymnast

See also
Loveys (surname)
Lovie (name)